Gury may refer to:

People
 Gury Kolosov (1867–1936), Russian and Soviet mathematician and engineer
 Gury Marchuk (1925–2013), Russian scientist
 Gury Nikitin (1620–1691), Russian painter
 Gury of Metz, also known as Goeric of Metz, French bishop and saint
 Jean-Pierre Gury (1801–1866), French Jesuit moral theologian

Places
 Gury, Oise, commune in the Oise department in northern France